Harold Wilson formed a total of two non-consecutive Shadow Cabinets:

First Shadow Cabinet of Harold Wilson, 1963–1964
Second Shadow Cabinet of Harold Wilson, 1970–1974